Speakers of the Missouri House of Representatives are (listed by year they assumed office):

	1820	 James Caldwell Democratic-Republican - St. Genevieve
	1821	 Henry S. Geyer	Democratic-Republican - St. Louis
	1826	 Alexander Stuart Democratic-Republican - St. Louis
	1828	 John Thornton D - Clay
	1832	 Thomas Reynolds	D - Howard
	1834	 John Jameson	D - Callaway
	1838	 Thomas H. Harvey D - Saline
	1840	 Sterling Price	D - Chariton
	1844	 Claiborne F. Jackson D - Saline
	1848	 Alexander M. Robinson D - Platte
	1850	 Nathaniel W. Watkins D - Scott
	1852	 Reuben Shelby D - Perry
	1854	 William Newland Whig - Ralls
	1856	 Robert C. Harrison	Whig - Cooper
	1857	 James Chiles	D - Jackson
	1858	 John T. Coffee	D - Dade
	1860	 Christian Kribben D - St. Louis
	1860	 John McAfee D - Shelby
	1862	 L.C. Marvin R - Henry
	1864	 Walter L. Lovelace	R - Montgomery
	1865	 Andrew J. Harlan R - Andrew
	1869	 John C. Orrick R - St. Charles	
	1871	 Robert P.C. Wilson D - Platte	
	1873	 Mortimer McIlhaney D - Audrain	
	1875	 Banton G. Boone D - Henry	
	1877	 John F. Williams D - Macon	
	1879	 J. Edwin Belch D - Cole	
	1881	 Thomas P. Bashaw D - Monroe	
	1883	 Joseph S. Richardson D - Stoddard	
	1885	 John M. Wood D - Clark
	1887	 Joshua W. Alexander D - Daviess	
	1889	 Joseph J. Russell D - Mississippi	
	1891	 Wilbur F. Tuttle D - Pettis	
	1893	 Thomas W. Mabrey D - Ripley	
	1895	 B.F. Russell R - Crawford	
	1897	 John W. Farris D - Laclede	
	1899	 William J. Ward D - Stoddard	
	1901	 James H. Whitecotton D - Monroe	
	1905	 David W. Hill R - Butler	
	1907	 J.M. Atkinson D - Ripley	
	1909	 Alfred A. Speer R - Cole	
	1911	 John T. Barker D - Carroll	
	1913	 James H. Hull D - Platte	
	1915	 James P. Boyd D - Monroe
	1917	 Drake Watson D - Ralls	
	1919	 S.F. O'Fallon R - Holt	
	1923	 Oak Hunter D - Randolph	
	1925	 Jones H. Parker R - St. Louis	
	1927	 E.H. Winter R - Warren	
	1929	 Jones H. Parker R - St. Louis	
	1931	 Eugene W. Nelson D - Marion	
	1933	 Willis H. Meredith	 D - Butler
	1935	 John G. Christy D - Jefferson	
	1941	 Morris E. Osborn	D - Shelby
	1943	 Howard Elliott R - St. Louis	
	1947	 Murray E. Thompson R - Webster
	1949	 Roy Hamlin D - Marion	
	1953	 L.A. Vonderschmidt R - Holt	
	1954	 Richard M. Webster R - Jasper	
	1955	 Roy Hamlin D - Marion	
	1959	 Richard H. Ichord D - Texas
	1961	 Thomas D. Graham D - Cole	
	1967	 James E. Godfrey D - St. Louis	
	1973	 Richard J. Rabbitt	 D - St. Louis
	1977	 Kenneth J. Rothman D - St. Louis	
	1981	 Bob F. Griffin D - Clinton	
	1996	 Steve Gaw D - Randolph	
	2001	 Jim Kreider D - Christian
	2002	 Catherine Hanaway R - St. Louis	
	2005	 Rod Jetton R - Bollinger
	2009	 Ron Richard R - Jasper
	2011	 Steven Tilley R - Perry
	2012	 Tim Jones R - St. Louis
	2015	 John Diehl R - St. Louis
	2015	 Todd Richardson R - Butler
	2019	 Elijah Haahr R - Greene
	2021	 Rob Vescovo R - Jefferson

References

Speakers
Missouri
1820 establishments in Missouri Territory